Naxibacter alkalitolerans is a chemo-organotrophic, catalase-positive, aerobic, and Gram-negative bacterium, which was isolated from a soil sample collected from Yunnan Province in China. Phylogenetic analyses have shown that it belongs to the Oxalobacteraceae.

References

Burkholderiales
Bacteria described in 2005